

B

The DST column shows the months in which Daylight Saving Time, a.k.a. Summer Time, begins and ends. A blank DST box usually indicates that the location stays on Standard Time all year, although in some cases the location stays on Summer Time all year. If a location is currently on DST, add one hour to the time in the Time column.

Notes
  Morocco temporarily suspends DST for the month of Ramadan.
  BAK is common IATA code for Heydar Aliyev International Airport  and Zabrat Airport .
  BHZ is common IATA code for Tancredo Neves International Airport  and Belo Horizonte/Pampulha – Carlos Drummond de Andrade Airport .
  BJS is common IATA code for Beijing Capital International Airport , Beijing Nanyuan Airport  and Beijing Daxing International Airport .
  BUE is common IATA code for Ministro Pistarini International Airport  and Jorge Newbery Airfield .
  BUH is common IATA code for Henri Coandă International Airport  and Aurel Vlaicu International Airport .

References

Footnotes

Sources
  - includes IATA codes
 
 IATA and ICAO airport codes Aviation Safety Network
 Great Circle Mapper - IATA, ICAO and FAA airport codes

B